The Sharks were a rhythm and blues band from Albany N.Y. from early 80's to mid 90's and opened for numerous recording artists such as Tower of Power, Stevie Ray Vaughan.

History
The band members started by playing cover versions of songs by new wave artists such as Elvis Costello, U2, and Talking Heads, but soon progressed to performing their own material as The Sharks. The band built up a regular following, playing gigs up and down the East coast, and their first single caught the ear of Billy Terrel, who asked the band to record a cover of "Fly Like an Eagle" for the Philadelphia Eagles Super Bowl XV team. This led to a guest spot on AM Philadelphia and gigs at venues such as New York's CBGB.

They won MTV's Basement Tape Competition in 1985 by the largest margin in the history of the MTV Basement Tape Competition, leading to a four-EP contract with Elektra Records, who immediately put The Sharks into RPM Studios and The Power Station in NYC to record In A Black and White World which featured "On My Own" and "Only Time Will Tell". Videos for both songs were shot on location in Times Square in NYC. "Only Time Will Tell" was the second most requested song during MTV's Top 10 Countdown for 2 weeks in a row in 1988. With the success of the Elektra release and the support of MTV, the Sharks toured and shared the stage with The Go-Go's, A Flock of Seagulls, Robert Palmer, Joan Jett and The Blackhearts, The Romantics, Night Ranger, The Fixx, and The Stray Cats. The band had a falling out with Elektra, but continued to tour and record. In 1986 guitarist Steve Zero, was replaced by Philadelphia-based guitarist, Roger Girke, who had previously been with Robert Hazard, The Front and Pegasus. Girke stayed with the band until his departure in 1989. With 12 successful years and a lifetime of great memories, The Sharks decided to call it quits in 1992, when they realized that Elektra records was not holding up to their promise. The Sharks, with members Shea Quinn, Sam Lugar, Doug Phillips, Mark Showers and Steve Zero, have reunited yearly at The Village Nightclub in Lancaster, Pennsylvania for reunion concerts, where the band started. Sheaffer is a music teacher for the ELCO Middle school and Girke has been an active blues performer since 1990.

On October 8, 2009, lead singer Sam (Lugar) Rawhauser died of lung cancer, disbanding the band.

The Sharks have been performing with Sam's son singing lead vocals.

Photos

References

Musical groups established in 1979
Musical groups from Pennsylvania
American new wave musical groups